Malget is a surname and may refer to:

 Kevin Malget (born 1991), Luxembourgian footballer
 Théo Malget (born 1961), Luxembourgian footballer